Corey Lemonier (born November 19, 1991) is a former American football outside linebacker. He was drafted by the San Francisco 49ers in the third round of the 2013 NFL Draft. He played college football at Auburn.

Early years
Lemonier was born in Hialeah, Florida to Henry and Francoise Lemonier, who are hardworking, Haitian immigrants. He attended Hialeah High School, and played for the Hialeah Thoroughbreds high school football team.  He recorded 50 tackles and 10 sacks as a junior, and played in the 2010 Under Armour All-America Game.

Considered a four-star recruit by Rivals.com, he was ranked the 3rd best weakside defensive end in the nation.  He accepted a scholarship to Auburn over offers from LSU, Florida State, and Tennessee.

College career
Lemonier enrolled in Auburn University, where he played for the Auburn Tigers football team from 2010 to 2012.  As a freshman in 2010, he started one of 14 games, recording 17 tackles and two quarterback sacks.  He had three tackles in the tigers' victory in the 2011 BCS National Championship Game.  As a sophomore in 2011, he was a first-team All-SEC selection after recording 47 tackles and 9.5 sacks.  In his junior season in 2012, he recorded 34 tackles and 5.5 sacks in 12 games.  He decided to forgo his senior season at Auburn and entered the 2013 NFL Draft.

Professional career

San Francisco 49ers
The San Francisco 49ers picked Lemonier in the third round, with the 88th overall pick, of the 2013 NFL Draft. In his rookie season, he recorded his first sack and safety against the Arizona Cardinals on quarterback Carson Palmer.

On September 3, 2016, he was released by the 49ers.

Cleveland Browns
On September 4, 2016, Lemonier was claimed off waivers by the Cleveland Browns. On December 14, 2016, Lemonier was waived by the Browns.

Detroit Lions
Lemonier was claimed off waivers by the Lions on December 15, 2016. He was released by the team on December 23, 2016.

New York Jets
Lemonier was claimed off waivers by the Jets on December 26, 2016. In his first game with the Jets, he recorded a sack and forced fumble against the Bills.

On March 9, 2017, Lemonier re-signed with the Jets. He was released on September 1, 2017.

References

External links
Auburn Tigers bio
San Francisco 49ers profile
ESPN stats

1991 births
Living people
American football defensive ends
American football linebackers
American sportspeople of Haitian descent
Auburn Tigers football players
Cleveland Browns players
Detroit Lions players
New York Jets players
People from Hialeah, Florida
Players of American football from Florida
San Francisco 49ers players
Sportspeople from Miami-Dade County, Florida
Hialeah Senior High School alumni